The Nile, in northeast Africa, is one of the world's longest rivers.

Nile may also refer to:

Places 
 Nile Township, Scioto County, Ohio, named after the River Nile

Entertainment 
 Nile (band), an American death metal band
 Nile (TV series), a BBC Television docudrama
 "The Nile Song", 1969 song by Pink Floyd
 Tana Nile, a fictional character in the Marvel Universe

Ships 
 , various British ships
 , various British ships
 Paddle steamer Nile, built in London for the Egyptian Navy, delivered in 1834  captained by William Light and afterwards John Hindmarsh

People 
 Nile (singer), American hip-hop blues artist

Given name 
 Nile Green, historian
 Nile Kinnick (1918–1943), American college football player
 Nile Niami, American film producer and real estate developer
 Nile Ranger (born 1991), British footballer
 Nile Rodgers (born 1952), American music producer and guitarist
 Nile Soik (1923–2001), American politician
 Nile Wilson (born 1996), British gymnast

Surname 
 Fred Nile (born 1934), Australian politician and activist
 Elaine Nile (1936–2011), Australian politician
 Willie Nile (born 1948), American singer and songwriter
 Sarah Nile (born 1985), Italian model, showgirl and reality television personality
 Cleo de Nile, fictional daughter of the mummy from Monster High
 Nefera de Nile, fictional daughter of the mummy from Monster High

Other 
 Battle of the Nile
 Blue Nile Inc, an American online jewelry retailer (NASDAQ: NILE)
 Link 22 (NATO Improved Link 11), a military wireless data exchange standard
 Denial

See also
 Niles (disambiguation)
 Nilotic (disambiguation)
 Nyle (disambiguation)
 Nyl River, a river in South Africa
 Nyl (disambiguation)
 Shatt en-Nil, a dry river bed in Iraq